Steve Duane Gordon (born April 15, 1969) is a former American professional football player who played four seasons in the National Football League (NFL) with the New England Patriots and San Francisco 49ers in 1992–1993 and 1997–1998, respectively. Gordon appeared in a total of 13 career games while making one start.

References

1969 births
Living people
Players of American football from California
San Francisco 49ers players
New England Patriots players
American football centers
California Golden Bears football players